The list below lists the churches in Budapest in spatial arrangement.

District I

Roman Catholic churches

Reformed churches

Evangelical churches

District II

Roman Catholic churches

Greek Catholic churches

Reformed churches

Evangelical churches

District III

Roman Catholic churches

Reformed churches

Evangelical churches

Other churches

District IV

Roman Catholic churches

Reformed churches

Evangelical churches

Other churches

District V

Roman Catholic churches

Reformed churches

Evangelical  churches

Unitarian churches

Ortodox churches

District VI

Roman Catholic churches

Ortodox churches

Other churches

District VII

Roman Catholic churches

Greek Catholic churches

Reformed churches

Evangelical churches

Ortodox churches

Other churches

District VIII

Roman Catholic churches

Reformed churches

Evangelical churches

Ortodox churches

Other churches

District IX

Roman Catholic churches

Reformed churches

Unitarian churches

Ortodox churches

Other churches

District X

Roman Catholic churches

Greek Catholic churches

Reformed churches

Evangelical churches

Other churches

District XI

Roman Catholic churches

Armenian Catholic churches

Reformed churches

Evangelical churches

Other churches

District XII

Roman Catholic churches

Reformed churches

Evangelical churches

District XIII

Roman Catholic churches

Reformed churches

Evangelical churches

Other churches

District XIV

Roman Catholic churches

Reformed churches

Evangelical churches

Other churches

District XV

Roman Catholic churches

Reformed churches

Evangelical churches

Other churches

District XVI

Roman Catholic churches

Reformed churches

Evangelical churches

Other churches

District XVII

Roman Catholic churches

Greek Catholic churches

Reformed churches

Evangelical churches

Other churches

District XVIII

Roman Catholic churches

Reformed churches

Evangelical churches

Unitarian churches

Other churches

District XIX

Roman Catholic churches

Greek Catholic churches

Reformed churches

Evangelical churchesk

Other churches

District XX

Roman Catholic churches

Greek Catholic churches

Reformed churches

Evangelical churches

Other churches

District XXI

Roman Catholic churches

Greek Catholic churches

Reformed churches

Evangelical churches

Other churches

District XXII

Roman Catholic churches

Greek Catholic churches

Reformed churches

Evangelical churches

Other churches

District XXIII

Roman Catholic churches

Reformed churches

Evangelical churches

Jegyzetek

Literature 
 Gr. La Rosée Erzsébet: Budapest katolikus templomai, Szent István Társulat, Budapest, 1938.
 (szerk.) Kováts J. István: Magyar református templomok I–II., Athenaeum-Betűvetés Könyv- és Lapkiadóvállalat Kft., Budapest, 1942.
 (szerk.) Kemény Lajos - Gyimesy Károly: Evangélikus templomok, Athenaeum-Evangélikus Templomok Kiadóhivatala, Budapest, 1944.
 (szerk.) Déri Erzsébet: Katolikus templomok Magyarországon, Hegyi & Társa Kiadó Bt., Budapest, 1992, 
 Református templomok Magyarországon, Hegyi & Társa Kiadó Bt., Budapest, 1992, 
 Evangélikus templomok Magyarországon, Hegyi & Társa Kiadó Bt., Budapest, 1992, 
 (szerk.) Diós István: Katolikus templomok és plébániák címjegyzéke. A Magyar Katolikus Egyház Címtára 1992 – Püspökségek, plébániák és szerzetesrendek címei, Szent István Társulat, Budapest, 1992, 
 Református templomok Budapesten. Két évszázad kulturtörténete és művészete 1785–1995, Bíró Family Nyomdapiari és Kereskedelmi Kft., Budapest, 1996, 
 Zugló templomai és történelmi egyházai / [anyaggyűjtésben és a szerkesztésben részt vettek Békássy Csaba et al.], Herminamező Polgári Köre, Budapest, 2001.
 Prakfalvi Endre: Római katolikus templomok. Az egyesített fővárosban, Budapest Főváros Önkormányzata Főpolgármesteri Hivatala, Budapest, 2003, 
 Csigó László: Magyar evangélikus templomok, Anno Kiadó, Budapest, 2006, 
 Tatár Sarolta: Magyar katolikus templomok, Tóth Könyvkereskedés és Kiadó Kft., Debrecen, 2009,

Church-history series of the Budapesti Városvédő Egyesület (Budapest City Protection Association) 
 Kiadja a Budapesti Városvédő Egyesület. 2021-ig megjelent kötetek:
 Budapest templomai: I. kerület. 2012.
 Budapest templomai: III. kerület. 2002. (ezt még az Óbudai Múzeum adta ki)
 Budapest templomai: Újpest, IV. kerület. 2015.
 Budapest templomai: V. kerület. 2003.
 Budapest templomai: Terézváros, VI. kerület. 2016.
 Budapest templomai: Erzsébetváros, VII. kerület. 2014.
 Budapest templomai: Józsefváros, VIII. kerület. 2009.
 Budapest templomai: Ferencváros, IX. kerület. 2009.
 Budapest templomai: Kőbánya, X. kerület. 2010.
 Budapest templomai: XI. kerület. 2014.
 Budapest templomai: XII. kerület. 2005.
 Budapest templomai: Angyalföld, XIII. kerület. 2017.
 Budapest templomai: XVI. kerület. 2009.
 Budapest templomai: Rákosmente, XVII. kerület. 2009.
 Budapest templomai: XVIII. kerület: Pestszentlőrinc, Pestszentimre. 2012.
 Budapest templomai: Kispest, XIX. kerület. 2016.
 Budapest templomai: Pesterzsébet, XX. kerület. 2008.

Budapest